The anarchist philosophical and political movement has some connections to elements of the animal liberation movement. Many anarchists are vegetarian or vegan (or veganarchists) and have played a role in combating perceived injustices against animals. They usually describe the struggle for the liberation of non-human animals as a natural outgrowth of the struggle for human freedom.

Veganism and anarchism 

Veganarchism is the political philosophy of veganism (more specifically animal liberation) and anarchism, creating a combined praxis as a means for social revolution. This encompasses viewing the state as unnecessary and harmful to animals, both human and non-human, whilst practicing a vegan lifestyle. Veganarchists either see the ideology as a combined theory, or perceive both philosophies to be essentially the same. It is further described as an anti-speciesist perspective on green anarchism, or an anarchist perspective on animal liberation.

Vegan anarchist subcultures promote total liberationism, which seeks to unite the fragmented movements for human, animal and earth (ecosystem) liberation into a larger and stronger movement.

See also 
 Animal rights
 Animal Liberation Front (ALF)
 Animal Rights Militia (ARM)
 Animal rights and punk subculture
 Food Not Bombs
 Green Scare
 Leaderless resistance
 List of animal rights advocates
 Revolutionary Cells – Animal Liberation Brigade (RCALB)

References

External links 
 Animal Liberation and Anarchism
 Anarchist Ethics: A Utilitarian Approach An anarchist perspective on the ethics of animal liberation
 The Domestication of Animals…and of Man (an essay by CrimethInc.)
 Veganism (another essay by CrimethInc.)
 Animal Liberation Through Trade Unions?, a Wobbly perspective
 Infoshop Review: Making a Killing: The Political Economy of Animal Rights
 Ambiguities of Animal Rights a criticism of animal rights from a social ecology perspective
 From animals to anarchism. 'Dysophia Open Letter *3'

Animal rights and politics
Animal Liberation Front
Green anarchism
Issues in anarchism